Soo Curlers Association is a curling club located in Sault Ste. Marie, Ontario. The curling club has been a registered club since 1944. Today the club is home to the Olympic gold medallists Team Brad Jacobs.

The club plays at the Community First Curling Centre, which was given its name in 2015 after being sponsored by Community First Credit Union.

Alumni

References

http://www.soocurlers.com/Site/pages/history.htm
http://www.soocurlers.com/index.htm

Curling clubs in Canada
Curling in Northern Ontario
Sports venues in Sault Ste. Marie, Ontario
Curling clubs established in 1944
1944 establishments in Ontario